Gimnasio Nacional José Adolfo Pineda (known as the National Gymnasium in some English sources) is an indoor sporting arena located in San Salvador, El Salvador. The capacity of the arena is 12,500 spectators.  It is mainly used to host basketball and other indoor sporting events.  It also hosted the Miss Universe 1975 competition on CBS with Bob Barker.

Puerto Rican recording artist Ricky Martin performed at the arena on 18 October 2011 for his Música + Alma + Sexo World Tour.

It has been used by the basketball team Santa Tecla BC.

History
Built between 1950 and 1956, named after basketball player José Adolfo "Chorro de Humo" Pineda; a noticeable character who led the national salvadorean basketball team to win the gold in the VIII Juegos Centroamericanos y del Caribe in 1959.

References

External links
Stadium information
Stadium picture 

Indoor arenas in El Salvador
Basketball venues in El Salvador
Volleyball venues in El Salvador
San Salvador